Charles or Charlie Daly may refer to:

Charles Dudley Daly (1880–1959), known as Charlie, American football player and coach
Charles P. Daly (1816–1899), American politician, author and president of the American Geographical Society
Charles Daly firearms, U.S. firearms company
Charlie Daly (1896–1923), member of the Irish Republican Army
Chuck Daly (1930–2009), basketball coach

See also
Charles Daily (1900–1974), English first-class cricketer
Charles Daley (1890–1976), Canadian politician

Daly, Charles